Cheick Fantamady Diarra (born 11 February 1992) is a Malian professional footballer who plays as a striker for  club Paris 13 Atletico.

Career
Diarra began his career with  Centre Salif Keita, later played with Stade Malien. On 6 July 2011, he moved to Rennes. He was loaned to Ligue 2 club Istres for the 2013–14 season.

He was again loaned in Ligue 2 the following season to Auxerre.

On 15 July 2016, Fantamady Diarra joined Ligue 2 club Tours.

On 18 August 2018, he joined Ligue 2 club Châteauroux.

On 8 September 2021, he moved to Créteil for the 2021–22 season.

On 17 July 2022, Diarra signed with Paris 13 Atletico.

Career statistics

International goals
Scores and results list Mali's goal tally first, score column indicates score after each Diarra goal.

Honours
Mali
Africa Cup of Nations bronze: 2013

References

External links
 
 Cheick Fantamady Diarra's profile, stats & pics
 

1992 births
Living people
Sportspeople from Bamako
Association football forwards
Malian footballers
Mali international footballers
2013 Africa Cup of Nations players
Stade Malien players
Stade Rennais F.C. players
FC Istres players
AJ Auxerre players
Paris FC players
Tours FC players
LB Châteauroux players
USL Dunkerque players
US Créteil-Lusitanos players
Paris 13 Atletico players
Ligue 1 players
Ligue 2 players
Championnat National players
Malian expatriate footballers
Malian expatriate sportspeople in France
Expatriate footballers in France
21st-century Malian people